Jilawatan (Urdu: جلاوطن, literal English translation: exile) is the debut album by Pakistani rock band, Call. It was released on November 20, 2005 and gained huge popularity. It was the second album produced by the band's guitarist, Xulfi. The album was received with quite a bit of critical acclaim as well, spending over a year on the Vibes Charts.

Background
The word Jilawatan means being exiled from one's country, state or mind. The album uses the word jilawatan in the context of being exiled from one's own mind. Xulfi said to MTV Moto:

The majority of the album is pretty heavy and features the drop-d tuning on guitar. The only exceptions to this are Sab Bhula Kai, Nishaan and Bichar Kai Bhee. Sab Bhula Kai and Bichar Kai Bhee feature guitars with the DADGAD (low to high) tuning whilst Nishaan's guitars feature the traditional EADGBE tuning. Almost all the tracks on the album have acoustic guitars except Shayad, Kuch Naheen, Jilawatan and Wujud and all of the tracks, with the exception of Pukaar and Jilawatan, feature guitar solos.

During live performances, the band plays several songs differently from the album. They usually include an unplugged version of Shayad, include a solo in Jilawatan, perform a completely different solo on Sab Bhula Kai and play the piano intro of Kismet a bit differently on guitars.

Track listing
All songs composed & arranged by Zulfiqar J. Khan and Junaid Khan, except for Shayad & Bichar Kai Bhee music by Zulfiqar J. Khan and Jilawatan, Sab Bhula Kai & Wujud music by Sultan Raja, Zulfiqar J. Khan and Junaid Khan.

Personnel
Call
Junaid Khan - lead vocals
Zulfiqar J. Khan - lead guitar, bass guitar, backing vocals
Sultan Raja - bass guitars
Waqar Ahmed Khan - drums

Production
Produced by Zulfiqar J. Khan
Recorded & Mixed at Xth Harmonic Studio in Lahore, Pakistan
Assisted by Zulfiqar J. Khan

Chart performance

Singles

Awards and nominations
The album has received nominations in several Pakistani award ceremonies. The following list contains all of them.

2nd Jazz IM Awards
Best Debut - Pukaar
Best Solo - Sub Bhula Kai

3rd Jazz IM Awards
 Best Ballad - Sab Bhula Kai
 Best Alternative Rock Song - Pukaar

Lux Style Awards
 Best Album - Jilawatan

The Musik Awards
 Best Ballad - Sab Bhula Kai
 Best Album - Jilawatan
 Best Lyrics - Zulfiqar 'Xulfi' J. Khan
 Best Music Producer - Zulfiqar 'Xulfi' J. Khan

References

External links
 Official Website
 Jilawatan Guitar Tabs

2005 debut albums
Urdu-language albums
Call (band) albums